Simone Oldenburg (born 22 March 1969) is a German politician of The Left who has been Deputy Minister-President of Mecklenburg-Vorpommern since 2021. She has been a member of the Landtag of Mecklenburg-Vorpommern since 2011, and served as parliamentary leader of The Left since September 2016. Since June 2018, she has also been co-deputy leader of the federal party. Oldenburg was The Left's lead candidate for the 2021 state election.

Early life and education
Simone Oldenburg was born in 1969 in Wismar. After graduating from high school there, she first completed a teaching degree in German and history at the Leipzig University of Education, then at the University of Leipzig in 1994. She then worked as a teacher at the regional school in Klütz.

Political career
Oldenburg has been a member of the municipal council of Gägelow since 2004, and since 2009 of the Nordwestmecklenburg district council. She was elected to the state Landtag in the 2011 state election, second on The Left party list. She also ran unsuccessfully in the direct mandate of Nordwestmecklenburg I. After the constituent session of parliament, she became deputy leader of the party's parliamentary group.

She was re-elected in the 2016 state election. After the election, she was elected leader of The Left's parliamentary group. She was elected deputy chair of the federal Left party at a conference in June 2018. In 2021, she was nominated as lead candidate for the upcoming state election.

The Left won 9.9% of votes in the election, placing fourth. After the election, Oldenburg stated that the landslide victory of the Social Democratic Party called for a shift to the left in government. On 13 October, the SPD entered coalition talks with the Left. The parties successful agreed to a coalition government, and Oldenburg was sworn in as Deputy Minister-President and education minister on 15 November.

References

1969 births
Living people
People from Wismar
The Left (Germany) politicians
Members of the Landtag of Mecklenburg-Western Pomerania
21st-century German politicians
21st-century German women politicians